Catch a Christmas Star is a 2013 Hallmark Channel film starring Shannon Elizabeth and directed by John Bradshaw. The film first aired on November 17, 2013.

Plot
Chris Marshall (a widower for the past five years, with two children) works as a New Jersey high school basketball coach.

His daughter Sophie learns that Chris' first love in high school was Nikki Crandon, who has since become a successful pop star.  Thus, Sophie plots to get the two back together.

Cast
 Shannon Elizabeth as Nikki Crandon  
 Steve Byers as Chris Marshall 
 Kyle Harrison Breitkopf as Jackson Marshall   
Julia Lalonde as Sophie Marshall  
Zack Werner as Jaycee Silvestri
Doug MacLeod as Mark
Maria Ricossa as Shelley
Billy MacLellan as Jason
 Christopher Jacot as Carmine
Christopher Russell as Henry Williams

Accolades

See also
 List of Christmas films

References

External links
 
 

2013 television films
2013 films
American Christmas films
Hallmark Channel original films
Christmas television films
Films directed by John Bradshaw (director)
2010s English-language films